Micropus amphibolus is a species of flowering plant in the family Asteraceae known by the common name Mount Diablo cottonseed. It is endemic to California, where it is known from the San Francisco Bay Area and nearby mountains, growing in open, rocky habitat. It is an annual herb similar in appearance to its relative, Micropus californicus, called the "Q-tips". It produces one or more small, erect stems coated thinly in wispy, webby fibers. The inflorescence is a spherical flower head a few millimeters wide which resembles a tiny cotton boll since the flowers and maturing fruits are very woolly.

References

External links
Jepson Manual Treatment
USDA Plants Profile
Flora of North America
Photo gallery

Gnaphalieae
Endemic flora of California
Flora without expected TNC conservation status